Rural Township may refer to:

Taiwan 
 Rural township (Taiwan)

United States 
Rural Township, Rock Island County, Illinois
Rural Township, Shelby County, Illinois
Rural Township, Jefferson County, Kansas

Township name disambiguation pages